Tom Clancy's The Division Heartland is an upcoming free-to-play third person shooter action game developed by Red Storm Entertainment and published by Ubisoft. It is a standalone spin-off set in The Division universe. Heartland is set to be released for PlayStation 4, PlayStation 5, Windows, Xbox One, Xbox Series X and Series S, and Amazon Luna.

Gameplay
Unlike the first two games in the series, Heartland is set in rural America. The player once again assumes control of an agent from the Division. The game features two major game modes. The first mode, "Storm Operations", is a player-versus-player-versus-environment mode which can support a maximum of 45 players. In this mode, players must fend off against agents from a rogue factions known as the Vultures while surviving a virus. The second mode is named Excursion Operations, a player-versus-environment mode in which players can complete missions and collect loot/gear. At launch, the game features three character classes and six playable characters.

Development
Red Storm Entertainment led the development of the free-to-play title, while RedLynx and Ubisoft Romania provided assistance. According to Keith Edwards, the game's creative director, Heartland will feature "streamlined survival gameplay". The game was officially announced in May 2021. Initially set to be released in 2021, the game was delayed to 2022, and later 2023 for PlayStation 4, PlayStation 5, Windows, Xbox One, Xbox Series X and Series S, and Amazon Luna. An open beta would be released prior to the game's official launch.

References

External links

Upcoming video games scheduled for 2023
Cancelled Stadia games
Ubisoft games
Multiplayer online games
PlayStation 4 games
PlayStation 5 games
Third-person shooters
Tom Clancy games
Video games developed in the United States
Windows games
Xbox One games
Xbox Series X and Series S games
Video games set in the United States
Free-to-play video games
Red Storm Entertainment games